Role Model is the seventh studio album from Australian punk rockers Bodyjar. It was released by UNFD on 18 October 2013.
The music produced from this album includes a more power punk outcome which is similar to their other album Plastic Skies. It is the final Bodyjar album to feature original bassist Grant Relf, Who would leave the band in 2019.

Track listing

Charts

Personnel
Bodyjar
Cameron Baines – vocals, guitar
Tom Read – guitar
Grant Relf – bass guitar
Shane Wakker – drums,

References

External links
 Official Website

2013 albums
Bodyjar albums